The Honniasont (Oniasont, Oniassontke, Honniasontkeronon) were a little-known indigenous people of North America originally from eastern Ohio, western Pennsylvania and West Virginia. They appear to have inhabited the upper Ohio River valley, above Louisville, Kentucky.

Language

Honniasont may have been considered an Iroquoian language (Swanton 1953: 55-57). Charles Hanna believed their name, first appearing as Oniasont on 17th-century French maps, to be a variation of the name of the tribe recorded in West Virginia and western Virginia at the same time period, as Nahyssan and Monahassanough, i.e. the Tutelo, a Siouan language speaking people.

References

External links 
Erie History

Extinct Native American tribes
Indigenous peoples of the Northeastern Woodlands
Native American tribes in West Virginia
Native American tribes in Ohio
Native American tribes in Pennsylvania